Pygmy skates are cartilaginous fish belonging to the family Gurgesiellidae in the superorder Batoidea of rays. Nineteen species in three genera are known.

Genera
 Cruriraja
 Fenestraja
 Gurgesiella

References

Ray families
Rajiformes